Derek Lamely (born July 12, 1980) is an American professional golfer who has played on the PGA Tour and the Nationwide Tour.

Background

Lamely was born in Belleville, Illinois. He was a member of the Texas State Championship team at Montgomery High School. He played college golf at McNeese State University before transferring to Florida Gulf Coast University. He turned professional in 2004.

Lamely began his career on mini tours. He won the Iowa Open in 2004. He played on the Egolf Tarheel Tour in 2008. Lamely won the 2008 Waterloo Open Golf Classic which is the largest golf tournament in Iowa. Lamely went to PGA Tour qualifying school for the first time in 2008 but did not earn his card. Lamely joined the Nationwide Tour in 2009. He did not find much success until August when he won the Nationwide Children's Hospital Invitational in a playoff over Rickie Fowler. Lamely began the final round eight strokes behind the leader but his final round of 65 (-6) was enough to force a playoff. He finished 4th on the money list and earned his 2010 PGA Tour card.

In March 2010, he won his first PGA Tour event, the Puerto Rico Open by two strokes. The win earned Lamely $630,000 and a two-year exemption on the PGA Tour. Lamely was unable to repeat his success and did not have another top ten finish on the PGA Tour. He did not play in 2013 and missed the cut in the two events he played in 2014.

Professional wins (4)

PGA Tour wins (1)

Nationwide Tour wins (1)

Nationwide Tour playoff record (1–0)

Other wins (3)
2004 Iowa Open
2008 Waterloo Open Golf Classic, Greater Cedar Rapids Open Golf Classic

Results in major championships

CUT = missed the half-way cut
Note: Lamely only played in the U.S. Open and the PGA Championship.

See also
2009 Nationwide Tour graduates

References

External links

American male golfers
PGA Tour golfers
Korn Ferry Tour graduates
Golfers from Illinois
Golfers from Florida
Florida Gulf Coast Eagles athletes
McNeese State University alumni
Sportspeople from Belleville, Illinois
Sportspeople from Fort Myers, Florida
1980 births
Living people